is a Japanese dark fantasy isekai light novel series written by Aneko Yusagi. Originally published as a web novel in the user-generated novel site Shōsetsuka ni Narō, the series has since been published by Media Factory with an expanded story-line featuring illustrations by Seira Minami. As of June 25, 2019, twenty-two volumes have been published.

The novel series was adapted into a manga series by Aiya Kyū and published by Media Factory, with twenty-two volumes released as of December 22, 2022. Both the novel and manga series were licensed by One Peace Books and were published in North America starting in September 2015. The 25-episode anime television series adaptation produced by Kinema Citrus aired from January to June 2019.  A second season, co-produced by DR Movie, aired from April to June 2022. A third season has also been announced.

The anime series is currently licensed in North America by Crunchyroll.

Plot

Naofumi Iwatani, an easygoing Japanese youth, was summoned into a parallel world along with three other young Japanese men from parallel universes to become the world's Cardinal Heroes and fight inter-dimensional hordes of monsters called Waves. Each of the heroes were respectively equipped with their own legendary equipment when summoned. Naofumi happened to receive the Legendary Shield, the sole defensive equipment, while the other heroes received respectively a sword, a spear, and a bow, weapons meant for attack. Unlike the other heroes who are fully supported by the kingdom and gain several strong allies each, Naofumi's luck turns to the worse after his single companion, revealed to be the kingdom's princess, betrays him, steals all his belongings, and leaves him devoid of all assistance and supplies after she falsely accuses him of sexually assaulting her.

Mocked by the nobility and shunned by everyone from his fellow Heroes to peasants, a now cynical Naofumi is forced to train as a hero alone while working to make ends meet, until he buys from a slave trader a young tanuki demi-human girl named Raphtalia and an egg that hatches into a bird-like monster whom he names "Filo", both quickly growing into adulthood and becoming powerful warriors under his care. As they little by little gain the trust and gratitude of the people with their heroic actions, Naofumi and his companions work together to carry out their mission as saviors as they unravel the mystery of the Waves and the reason why they are a threat not only to their world, but to other worlds as well.

Media

Light novel

Originally published as a web novel, the series has been re-written with an expanded story-line. The series is currently published by Media Factory and features illustrations by Seira Minami. As of June 25, 2019, twenty-two volumes have been published. The novel series and the spin-off novel The Reprise of the Spear Hero was licensed by One Peace Books.

Manga

The light novel series was adapted into a manga series by Aiya Kyū and published by Media Factory, with twenty-two volumes released as of December 22, 2022. Both the novel and manga series were licensed by One Peace Books and were published in North America starting in September 2015.

Spin-off 
A comedy spin-off series was released in the 61st issue of Kadokawa Dengeki Daioh G. The four-panel comedy manga, titled A Day in the Life of the Shield Hero (盾の勇者のとある一日, Tate no Yūsha no to Aru 1-Nichi) was drawn by Akagashi.

Anime

An anime adaptation was announced in June 2017. The television series is produced by Kinema Citrus and directed by Takao Abo, with Keigo Koyanagi handling series composition, Masahiro Suwa designing the characters and Kevin Penkin composing the music. The series aired from January 9 to June 26, 2019, on AT-X and other channels. It ran for 25 episodes.

The first opening theme is "RISE", performed by MADKID, while the first ending theme is  performed by Chiai Fujikawa. The second opening theme is "FAITH," performed by MADKID, while the second ending theme is  performed by Fujikawa. For episode 4, Asami Seto sang an insert song titled "Falling Through Starlight" as her character Raphtalia. Both Crunchyroll and Funimation streamed the anime. Crunchyroll streamed the show in both the original Japanese version and the English dub. Plus Media Networks Asia licensed the series in Southeast Asia and is streaming it on Aniplus Asia, iQIYI, bilibili, Netflix, Disney+ Hotstar. Funimation started streaming the dub on May 1, 2019. Originally intending to air the English dub simultaneously with the original Japanese, Crunchyroll announced that there would be a two-week delay in the release of the English version on May 14, the day before episode 19, "The Four Cardinal Heroes", was scheduled to release.

At 2019's Crunchyroll Expo, it was announced that the series will receive a second and third season. Masato Jinbo replaced Takao Abo as director, and the rest of the staff members reprised their roles; Kinema Citrus is joined by DR Movie for animation production. During "Kadokawa Light Novel Expo 2020", it was originally revealed that the second season would premiere in October 2021, but it was later delayed. The second season aired from April 6 to June 29, 2022. It ran for 13 episodes. In Southeast Asia, Plus Media Networks Asia licensed the second season and is simulcasting it on Aniplus Asia, bilibili, IQIYI, Netflix. On May 2, 2022, Crunchyroll announced that the second season will begin airing its dub on May 4.

The third season is directed by Hitoshi Haga, with the rest of the staff from the previous season returning.

Video games
A mobile game titled  was released for iOS and Android devices on February 24, 2021. An adaptation of the anime titled The Rising of the Shield Hero: Relive The Animation was released for Steam on September 24, 2019, for iOS and Android devices on October 24, 2019.

Reception
The light novel series had over 3.3 million volumes in print by December 2018, and the manga series had 1 million tankobon volumes in print by January 2019. As of April 2019, the light novels and manga have sold a combined 6.2 million copies in Japan, after their sales increased by 1.2 million copies in two months, mainly due to the success of the anime series.

The character Raphtalia was selected as Best Girl for the Crunchyroll Anime Awards in 2020.

Reception and controversy in North America 
When the anime series began airing in North America, the first episode came under controversy. Several Anime News Network reviewers criticized the show for its depiction of slavery, raising the question of slavery apologism, and the framing of a false rape accusation, leading online fans to accuse the Western attackers of the anime show of being a “loud minority” and these fans hoped that the dub would not try to make changes to appease its critics. While one of the main Japanese members of the staff behind the anime openly rejected the controversy as "bullshit", when the show's producer Junichiro Tamura was asked about it, he responded that there "have not been any controversies regarding the series in Japan, so it is difficult to say. In the case there were any controversy domestically, we will try to address all issues with the staff and people involved to bring our customers a better product the next time."

Reviews of subsequent episodes have been generally positive. Theron Martin of Anime News Network gave a rating of B− for the first two episodes, stating "the series looks like it's gotten over its initial problematic hump and should hopefully slide into a more agreeable story flow." He gave a B+ rating for the third episode, stating that "the series seems like it's angling to build Naofumi up more as a folk hero than the famously brazen heroes we're used to seeing in fantasy stories" and that "episode 3 gives the best argument to date for the series' possible potential."

Notes

References

External links
  
  
  
  
 

2013 Japanese novels
2019 anime television series debuts
Anime and manga controversies
Anime and manga based on light novels
Book series introduced in 2012
Dark fantasy anime and manga
Fiction with false allegations of sex crimes
Funimation
Isekai anime and manga
Isekai novels and light novels
Kadokawa Dwango franchises
Kinema Citrus
Light novels
Light novels first published online
Media Factory manga
Novels about slavery
Parallel universes in fiction
Seinen manga
Shōsetsuka ni Narō
Upcoming anime television series